Pelophryne linanitensis, also known as the Linanit dwarf toad, is a species of toad in the family Bufonidae. It is endemic to Batu Linanit in Mount Murud in Sarawak, Borneo.

Description
Pelophryne linanitensis is a mid-sized species within its genus: adult males measure  in snout–vent length; females are unknown. The head is wider than it is long. The snout is vertical in lateral view. The tympanum is distinct. Supratympanic fold and parotoid gland are absent. The fingers are extremely short and stout, and with extensively webbed. The toes are long and almost fully webbed. The dorsum is predominantly brown and bears an indistinct, lighter brown hour-glass pattern. Males have a subgular vocal sac.

The male advertisement call consists of a metallic "ping" note that is repeated 4–5 times in a call series.

Habitat and conservation
The larval habitat is unknown but could be Nepenthes pitchers, near which the males were found.

The type locality is within the Pulong Tau National Park, but habitat loss is occurring within the park. Climate change is also a likely future threat to this species. It is likely a summit specialist with very limited range, likely about 1 km².

References

linanitensis
Endemic fauna of Borneo
Endemic fauna of Malaysia
Amphibians of Malaysia
Amphibians described in 2008
Taxa named by Indraneil Das
Amphibians of Borneo